Emoções (Portuguese and Capeverdean Creole for "Emotions", ALUPEK: "Emosonis")' is an album recorded by Val Xalino.  The album was released in 1993 and was released on vinyl and cassette and was recorded in Gothenburg, Sweden. The first song of the track "Rainha de Beleza" would be made into an album in 2006.  The re-edited singles of  "Salario de Formiga", "Nôs Coladera" and "Tragedia d'um Milionaria" would also appear in that album.

Track listing

References

1993 albums
Albums by Val Xalino